Castillejo de Iniesta is a municipality in Cuenca, Castile-La Mancha, Spain. It just west of Graja de Iniesta.

In recent years, there has been a movement to remove the Iniesta element in the name of the town.

References

Municipalities in the Province of Cuenca